Sirnoo is a small village which is located 1 km from the town of Pulwama, Kashmir, India.

Villages in Pulwama district